Misa Urqu (Quechua misa table, urqu mountain, literally "table mountain", hispanicized spelling Misa Orjo) is a mountain in the north of the Wansu mountain range in the Andes of Peru, about  high. It is situated in the Apurímac Region, Antabamba Province, Oropesa District. Misa Urqu lies north of Kisu Qutu on a ridge west of Willkarana.

References 

Mountains of Peru
Mountains of Apurímac Region